The Roman Catholic Diocese of Ensenada (erected 26 January 2007) is a suffragan diocese of the Archdiocese of Tijuana.

Ordinaries
Sigifredo Noriega Barceló (2007-2012), appointed Bishop of Zacatecas, México
Rafael Valdéz Torres (since 2013)

Episcopal See
Ensenada, Baja California

References

External links

Ensenada
Ensenada
Ensenada, Roman Catholic Diocese of
Ensenada
Ensenada